Hiliuţi may refer to several places in Moldova:

Hiliuţi, Făleşti, a commune in Făleşti district
Hiliuţi, Rîşcani, a commune in Rîşcani district